1965–66 Kuwaiti Premier League was the 5th season of the First League Division.

Overview
This season was played similar to the previous season, where the same clubs participated in the league table. Al Arabi managed to win its fifth title, and its second title without any defeat.

League table

References

RSSSF

Kuwait Premier League seasons
Kuwait
football